Seven ships of the Royal Navy have been named HMS Princess, HMS Princesse or HMS Princessa:

  was a 54-gun fourth rate launched in 1661 and broken up in 1680.
She was renamed HMS Prince in 1705, HMS Princess in 1716 and HMS Princess Royal in 1728. She was broken up in 1773.
  was a 70-gun third rate, originally the Spanish ship Princessa. She was captured in 1740, hulked in 1760 and sold in 1784.
She was captured in 1780, became a sheer hulk in 1784 and was broken up in 1809.
  was rated as a 28-gun sixth rate, originally the Dutch East Indiaman Williamstadt en Boetzlaar. She was captured on 18 August 1795 at the Capitulation of Saldanha Bay, and became a 26-gun floating battery in 1800. She was sold in 1816.
  was the former SS Kronprincess Cecilie, launched in 1905.
 was a hired patrol vessel which sank in 1940 after a collision

In addition, many ships have been named after specific princesses, including:

Citations

Reference

Royal Navy ship names